Toxochelys is an extinct genus of marine turtle from the Late Cretaceous period. It is the most commonly found fossilized turtle species in the Smoky Hill Chalk, in western Kansas.

Description
Toxochelys was about 2 m (6 ft) in length. Two species in the genus are recognized, Toxochelys latiremis and Toxochelys moorevillensis. Phylogenetic analysis shows that Toxochelys belong to an extinct lineage of turtles transitional between modern sea turtles and other turtles.

Toxochelys bauri Williston, 1905, based on the skeleton YPM 1786, is a synonym of Ctenochelys stenoporus.

References

Cope, E. D. 1873. [On Toxochelys latiremis]. Proceedings of the Academy of Natural Sciences of Philadelphia 25:10.
Hay, O. P. 1896. On the skeleton of Toxochelys latiremis. Publ. Field Columbian Museum, Zoological Ser. (later Fieldiana: Zoology), 1(5):101–106, pls. 14 &15.
Case, E.C. 1898. Toxochelys. The University Geological Survey of Kansas, Part IV. 4:370–385. pls. 79–84.
Hay, O.P. 1905. A revision of the species of the family of fossil turtles called Toxochelyidae, with descriptions of two new species of Toxochelys and a new species of Porthochelys. Bulletin of the American Museum of Natural History 21(10):177–185.
Druckenmiller, P. S., A. J. Daun, J. L. Skulan and J. C. Pladziewicz. 1993. Stomach contents in the upper Cretaceous shark Squalicorax falcatus. Journal of Vertebrate Paleontology. 13(supplement. to no. 3):33A.
Carrino, M.H. 2007. Taxonomic comparison and stratigraphic distribution of Toxochelys (Testudines: Cheloniidae) of South Dakota. pp. 111–132 in Martin, J.E. and Parris D.C. (eds.), The Geology and Paleontology of the Late Cretaceous Marine Deposits of the Dakotas. Geological Society of America, Special Paper 427.
Konuki, R. 2008. Biostratigraphy of sea turtles and possible bite marks on a Toxochelys (Testudine, Chelonioidea) from the Niobrara Formation (Late Santonian), Logan County, Kansas and paleoecological implications for predator–prey relationships among large marine vertebrates. Unpublished Masters thesis, Fort Hays State University, Hays, Kansas, 141 pp, Appen. I-VI.
Matzke, A.T. 2008. A juvenile Toxochelys latiremis (Testudines, Cheloniidae) from the Upper Cretaceous Niobrara Formation of Kansas, USA. Neues Jahrbuch für Geologie und Paläontologie. Abhandlungen 249(3):371–380.
Matzke, A.T. 2009. Osteology of the skull of Toxochelys (Testudines, Chelonioidea) (with 25 text-figures). Palaeontographica Abteilung'' A 288(4):93–150.

External links
www.scistp.org
gsa.confex.com
njfossils.net

Chelonioidea
Late Cretaceous turtles of North America
Taxa named by Edward Drinker Cope
Fossil taxa described in 1873
Prehistoric turtle genera
Mooreville Chalk
Extinct turtles